Hi-5 Philippines is the Filipino version of the Australian children's edutainment series of the same title as the first franchise in Asia. Hi-5 Philippines had its first broadcast on TV5 on June 15, 2015, and aired every Monday to Friday morning. The series mostly adapted the original version's Season 11-13.

Hi-5 Philippines was televised exclusively on said network until is final episode debuted on April 29, 2016, at the end of its second season. On May 2, 2016, episodes of the second season aired in reruns and from January 9 to September 1, 2017, the second season reran in shortened format featuring only the first two segments of each episode due to time constrains (when newer shows began to air).

The contract approved by TV5 and Hi-5 Operations Pte. Ltd. was good for only 2 seasons.

Introduction
Launched in Australia in 1999, Hi-5 rapidly grew in popularity over the years. It has won three Logie Awards for Most Outstanding Children's Program, five ARIA Awards for Best Children's Album and five Australian DVD and Video Industry Awards, among other achievements. It was then that Hi-5 started expanding its reach by franchising the show across North America, Europe, Australasia, Latin America, and Asia. However, this is the first time that the Hi-5 franchise assembled an entirely new cast for the localization of the show in Asia. The Filipino version of the musical group is currently one of the only two casts for Hi-5, the other one being the Australian cast.

Cast
 Aira Biñas - Word Play
 Fred Lo - Shapes in Space
 Gerard Pagunsan - Making Music
 Alex Reyes - Puzzles and Patterns
 Rissey Reyes - Body Move

Songs of the Week

Season 1 (2015)
 Five Senses (15–19 June)
 Robot Number One (22–26 June)
 L.O.V.E. (29 June–July 3)
 Planet Earth (6–10 July)
 Amazing (13–17 July)
 Living in a Fairytale (20–24 July)
 Making Music (27–31 July)
 The Dancing Bus (3–7 August)
 Underwater Discovery (10–14 August)

Season 2 (2016)
 Toy Box (22–26 February)
 Hi-5 Farm (29 February–March 4)
 Wish Upon a Star (7–11 March)
 Happy Monster Dance (14–18 March)
 (Some Kind of) Wonderful (28 March–April 1)
 Happy House (4–8 April)
 Knock, Knock, Knock (11–15 April)
 Stand Up Tall on Tippy Toes (18–22 April)
 Let's Get Away (25–29 April)

See also 
 List of programs aired by TV5 (Philippine TV network)

External links 

 Meet the members of Hi-5 Philippines

Philippine television shows featuring puppetry
2015 Philippine television series debuts
2016 Philippine television series endings
TV5 (Philippine TV network) original programming
Philippine television series based on Australian television series
Filipino-language television shows
Philippine children's television series
Filipino pop music groups
2010s preschool education television series